Barsa is a town in Bam Province, Burkina Faso. It had a population of 563.

References

Sources

Populated places in the Centre-Nord Region